Daniel Jonathan Sieradski (born June 19, 1979) is an American writer and activist. He was the founding publisher and editor-in-chief of Jewschool, a left-wing Jewish weblog.

Career

In 2001, Sieradski, founded Jewschool, which was called "influential" by Cnet. Sieradski has also worked as a web designer and digital strategist with several Jewish organizations, including the Jewish Telegraphic Agency.

Activism

Googlebomb
In 2004, Sieradski organized a so-called googlebomb, an attempt at manipulating Google's search rankings.  Responding to outrage over the placement of an antisemitic website atop the results on Google's search for the term "Jew" and a call for Google to censor its search results led by Steven Weinstock, Sieradski organized a campaign which replaced the site Jew Watch with Wikipedia's entry on Jews.

Corner Prophets
Sieradski organized hip-hop concerts with Israeli and Palestinian rappers, with a defunct project called Corner Prophets, with the stated intention of promoting peace and coexistence through the arts. He has also been a DJ on the jointly-operated Israeli-Palestinian FM radio station All For Peace which broadcasts from Ramallah.

Occupy Judaism
On October 7, 2011, citing the Hebrew prophet Isaiah's admonition to fast by "feeding the hungry, housing the homeless, breaking the bonds of oppression," Sieradski organized a Kol Nidre Yom Kippur prayer service at Occupy Wall Street, the mass demonstration for economic justice in Lower Manhattan that began in September 2011. Some reports placed attendance at upwards of 1,000. The Forward's editor Jane Eisner called it a positive "turning point" in American Judaism, while Commentary (magazine) called it "a deeply troubling trend that all who care about the Jewish future would do well to take seriously."

Nothing to Hide
In June 2013, reacting to Americans' complacency over the mass surveillance disclosures revealed by Edward Snowden, Sieradski set up a Twitter account, @_nothingtohide, that retweeted users who expressed a lack of concern or outright support for U.S. government surveillance. The account became the focus of a column by Ross Douthat in The New York Times.

Nazi Detector
In June 2016, Sieradski modified a Google Chrome extension called The Coincidence Detector that was used to identify Jews with echoes, with Sieradski's modified version surrounding the names of those on its list with swastikas. It was released it in the Chrome Web Store as The Nazi Detector. Replying to The Forward, Sieradski pointed out that "this is really about folks who are harassing other folks online. The ‘real’ Nazis are dead".

Anti-fascist activism
Sieradski identifies as an Anti-fascist and has been described as "Antifa's Most Prominent Jew". Along with other activists, he has pressured venues to ban fascist and racist events and organized counter-demonstrations.

Reaction
Sieradski has been described as "a major figure of the Jewish Internet world and a cultural trailblazer with a diverse fan base" by The Forward. B'nai B'rith Magazine called him a "fresh faced iconoclast ... redefining American Judaism," and Tikkun said he was "fast becoming one of the most recognized Jewish literary voices on the Internet." The Jewish Standard described Sieradski as "a leader in a Jewish movement that is trying to a create a new image for Judaism to project to its youth," he was called "an innovator in Jewish new media" by Editor & Publisher. In 2008, The Jewish Week counted Sieradski among a group of 36 Jewish New Yorkers under the age of 36 "who are combining mitzvot, leadership and passion in making the world a better place." In 2010, he was numbered among The Forward 50, an annual listing of the 50 most influential American Jews. Haaretz has called him a "professional thorn in the side of the American Jewish establishment."

Twitter Ban
In June 2017, Sieradski was banned from Twitter for terms of service violations including the publishing of personally identifying information (sometimes referred to as 'doxxing'), direct threats to the lives of the Jpost staff, amongst other issues. Sieradski had multiple Twitter accounts (all of which were also removed for the violations). According to Twitter's terms of service, they permanently ban only repeated violators.

In addition to the previous violations, Sieradski believes the ban could have also resulted from a campaign of harassment by a right-wing user called "Baked Alaska", who has posted antisemitic tweets, or for tweeting to Courtney Love during a Twitter argument with Linda Sarsour,.

References

1979 births
Living people
Jewish American activists
Jewish anti-fascists
Jewish bloggers
American bloggers